Yordenis Ugás Hernández (born 14 July 1986) is a Cuban professional boxer. He held the WBA (Super) welterweight title from 2021 to April 2022, having previously held the WBA (Regular) title from 2020 until being elevated to Super champion. As an amateur, Ugás won a gold medal at the 2005 World Championships and bronze at the 2008 Olympics, both in the lightweight division. As of October 2021, he is ranked as the world's third-best active welterweight by the Transnational Boxing Rankings Board, The Ring magazine and BoxRec. He is also ranked as the eighth-best active boxer, pound for pound, by BoxRec.

Ugas' nickname, 54 Milagros, comes from two people: "54" refers to baseball player Aroldis Chapman who wears the number 54, and is Ugas' best friend; "Milagros" is the name of Ugas' mother.

Amateur career
Ugás was U17 (cadets) world champion in 2003 but lost at the junior championships in 2004 to Amir Khan. On other occasions he lost twice to countryman Luis Franco at featherweight, he finished third at the nationals 2004 at featherweight.

In 2005 he moved up to lightweight where he was more successful, winning the Cuban Championships from 2005 to 2008 and turning into a star.
He won a tournament called PanAm Championships (not the PanAm Games) in 2005, however in other tournaments he lost twice to Kazach southpaw Serik Sapiyev.

At the Senior World Championships 2005 he suffered two heavy knockdowns against Canadian southpaw Ibrahim Kamal in his third fight but managed to win.
The Manila Times writes: "But for two fleeting moments Thursday, unheralded Canadian lightweight Ibrahim Kamal showed the world that the Cubans, arguably the number-one force in amateur boxing, may have jaws of glass after all.
The University of Toronto student knocked down Yordanis Ugás in the first and second rounds with two sledgehammer lefts to the side of the chin.
But then the Canadian southpaw hurt one knee as he and Ugás wrestled each other to the floor on the third round, leaving him effectively fighting on one leg." Later Ugás beat Russian Khabib Allakhverdiyev and in the final he outfought Romal Amanov from Azerbaijan. Cubanet.org writes "Yordenis Ugás, a sharp, technically accomplished fighter but with a suspect jaw, won the lightweight gold for Cuba after an explosive toe-to-toe clash with Romal Amanov of Azerbaijan." It describes him as "a tall, bony lightweight with a deceptively languid fighting style."

In 2006 he won the Central American Championships.

He was part of the Cuban national team that won the 2006 Boxing World Cup.

In 2007 he beat Yordan Frometa and Roniel Iglesias at the national championships.
Later that year Ugás won the PanAm Games in Rio beating Darleys Pérez and Everton Lopes. Cuba didn't participate in the World Championships in Chicago.

In 2008 he defended the national championships against old foe Luis Franco and won his Olympic qualifier.
In Beijing he was upset in the semifinal by Frenchman Daouda Sow.

In 2009 he went up to junior welterweight beating Roniel Iglesias in the national final.

In March 2010, Ugás moved to the United States in the hope of beginning a professional career. On 9 July 2010, he made his pro debut.

Ugás moved to North Bergen, New Jersey in 2012.

Olympic games
2008 in Beijing, China (as a lightweight)
Defeated Hamza Kramou (Algeria) 21-3
Defeated Domenico Valentino (Italy) 10-2
Defeated Georgian Popescu (Romania) 11-7
Lost to Daouda Sow (France) 8-15

World Championships
2005
Defeated Fayzuloyev Marufyon (Tajikistan) 28-14
Defeated Asghar Ali Shar (Pakistan) 28-14
Defeated Ibrahim Kamal (Canada) 23-14
Defeated Jong Sub-Baik (South Korea) 34-16
Defeated Khabib Allakhverdiyev (Russia) 45-22
Defeated Romal Amanov (Azerbaijan) 42-28

World Cup
2005 in Moscow, Russia (as a lightweight)
Defeated Pichai Sayotha (Thailand) 45–12 
Defeated Georgian Popescu (Romania) RSC-3
Lost to Serik Sapiyev (Kazakhstan) 35–46 
Defeated Murat Khrachev (Russia) 50–30

Cuban National Championship
2003 (featherweight)
Defeated Yosbel Melgarejo RSCO 2
Defeated Yudenis Gonzalez 35-31
Defeated Sander Rodriguez 21-7
Lost to Yosvani Aguilera 5-17 (2nd place)
2004 (featherweight)
Defeated Alexios Barrios 3-2
Defeated Lester Diaz 18-9
Lost to Luis Franco 13-13 54-65 (semifinal)
2005 (lightweight)
Defeated Ceilan Varona 17-4
Defeated Yosbel Melarejo 13-5
Defeated Michel Sarria Mendez 20-10
Defeated Raudel Sanchez (Cuba) 15-6
2006 (lightweight)
Defeated José Agramonte RSCO 2
Defeated Victor Perez walkover
Defeated Yoandri Lomba 23-7
Defeated Michel Sarria Mendez 25-9
2007 (lightweight)
Defeated Frank Isla RSC 2
Defeated Yordan Frometa  RSCO 3 (21-1)
Defeated Jorge Moiran 15-5
Defeated Julio Cesar Figueredo 25-1
Defeated Rosniel Iglesias (21-8
2008 (lightweight)
Defeated Onelis Perez]] 20-0
Defeated [[Luis Franco 14-4
Defeated Eldris Terrero 14-5
Defeated Pablo de la Cruz 17-3

Professional career

Early career
On 9 March 2019, Ugás fought his first career title fight against Shawn Porter for the WBC welterweight title. Ugás fought great and landed the cleaner shots throughout the fight. Porter had some success with his jab in the fourth round, but Ugás was the better man in the following round, after both fighters exchanged shots in the middle of the ring towards the end of the fifth. Ugás also had a stronger finish to the fight, and managed to cut Porter near his left eye in the tenth. After the final bell rang, Ugás' team already started celebrating, while Porter just stood and looked at his corner. To many of the fans' surprise, two of the judges scored the fight in favor of Porter, 116-112 and 115–113, while only one of the judges scored the fight in favor of Ugás, 117–111. The crowd was booing what seemed to many as a controversial split decision win for Porter.

In his next fight, Ugás dominated former world champion Omar Figueroa to a unanimous decision win, winning every round in the process. All three judges scored the fight 119-107 for the Cuban, who only had one point deducted for holding in the fifth round.

In his following fight, Ugás fought Mike Dallas Jr. Ugás boxed well and managed to hurt Dallas Jr on multiple occasions. After the seventh round, Dallas Jr's corner had seen enough and informed the referee he would not be continuing the fight.

WBA welterweight champion

Ugás vs. Ramos 
On 6 September 2020, Ugás fought Abel Ramos for the vacant WBA (Regular) welterweight title. Ugás outboxed Ramos, dominating most of the rounds throughout the fight. This earned Ugás a split decision victory, with one judge scoring the fight 117-111 for Ramos, while the other two had it narrowly for Ugás, both scoring it 115–113.

Ugás vs. Pacquiao 

On 29 January 2021, Ugás was elevated to the status of WBA (Super) champion after the previous title-holder, eight-division champion Manny Pacquiao, was stripped of his title due to inactivity. The latter had been scheduled to face undefeated WBC and IBF champion Errol Spence Jr. on 21 August 2021 at the T-Mobile Arena in Las Vegas, until Spence had to withdraw due to suffering an injury to his left eye. Subsequently, Ugás took Spence's place, and made the first defense of his WBA (Super) title against Pacquiao.

The bout was a competitive affair, with Ugás using his jab and looping right hand effectively to control the distance. While Pacquiao had moments of success throughout the night, he never truly settled into a rhythm and was noticeably stiffer than usual, not showcasing the deft footwork that he has been known for throughout his career. Pacquiao himself admitted after the fight that his legs were "tight". At the final bell, Ugás was awarded a unanimous decision victory with scores of 116–112, 116-112 and 115–113. According to CompuBox, Pacquiao threw over double the number of punches compared to Ugás, but landed fewer, making the latter the far more accurate boxer on the night. Pacquiao landed 130 punches of 815 thrown (16%), while Ugás landed 151 punches of 405 thrown (37.3%).

Ugás vs. Spence Jr. 

After successfully defending his title against Pacquiao, Ugás petitioned the WBA for a special permit to bypass a mandatory defense against Eimantas Stanionis in order to face the IBF and WBC champion Errol Spence Jr. in a title unification bout. The petition was denied by the WBA on 20 October 2021, who stated: "...we are in special circumstances to resolve extraordinary situations, such as the champion reduction in every division to have only one champion". Accordingly, Ugás and Stanionis were given a 30-day period to negotiate the terms of their bout. As they were unable to come to terms, a purse bid was ordered for 9 December, with a minimal bid of $200,000. The winning bid would be split 75/25 in favor of Ugas as the reigning titlist. On 19 December 2021, WBA President Gilberto J. Mendoza has confirmed that the Spence-Ugas was approved as Stanionis was willing to step aside. The unification bout was officially announced on 8 February 2022. It was scheduled to headline a pay per view card on 16 April, which took place at the AT&T Stadium in Arlington, Texas. The PPV was distributed by Showtime. Ugás lost the fight by a tenth-round technical knockout. The fight was stopped on the advice of the ringside physician, due to Ugas’ severely swollen right eye. He was losing on all three of the judges' scorecards at the time of the stoppage, with scores of 88–82, 88–82 and 88–83. Ugás landed fewer total punches (216 to 96) and fewer power punches (192 to 77) than Spence Jr.

Post title reign
On March 16, 2023, the WBC ordered Ugas to face the former WBA welterweight champion Mario Barrios for the interim welterweight championship.

Professional boxing record

Pay-per-view bouts

References

 Record

External links
 

 

1986 births
Living people
Sportspeople from Santiago de Cuba
Boxers at the 2007 Pan American Games
Boxers at the 2008 Summer Olympics
Olympic boxers of Cuba
Olympic bronze medalists for Cuba
Olympic medalists in boxing
Medalists at the 2008 Summer Olympics
People from North Bergen, New Jersey
Cuban male boxers
AIBA World Boxing Championships medalists
Pan American Games gold medalists for Cuba
Pan American Games medalists in boxing
Central American and Caribbean Games gold medalists for Cuba
Competitors at the 2006 Central American and Caribbean Games
Lightweight boxers
Light-welterweight boxers
Welterweight boxers
Central American and Caribbean Games medalists in boxing
World Boxing Association champions
Medalists at the 2007 Pan American Games
21st-century Cuban people